Alhambra-Home on the Hill (The antebellum columned house) was built in 1832 by Major Philip Walker Hemphill, a planter born in Chester County, South Carolina, and was one of four founders of Rome. The land was deep in Cherokee Indian Nation and is now known as the oldest house in Floyd County, Georgia.

History
The process for building the house was difficult due to the location of the land he wanted. The material he needed to build the house, such as logs, was floated down the Coosa River on steam boats. Major Philip lived in that house with three other planters, Colonel Daniel R. Mitchell from Canton, Colonel Zachariah B. Hargrove of Cassville, and Colonel William Smith of Cave Spring. The four of them chose a name for the town by putting different options in a hat then drew out the name “Rome”.

After Major Philip’s wife died he left Rome and died in Carroll County, Mississippi. He sold the property to William T. Price.

Darlington’s Home

In 1905 a merchant named John Paul Cooper and Alice Allgood Cooper founded Darlington. Seven years later, in 1912, they purchased Major Philips' home. Every president of Darlington School has lived in what came to be known as the home on the hill. The first president, Dr. Wilcox,  who gave the location its name, lived there happily for 32 years. The next president, Dr. Ernest L. Wright, initiated the first of many remodeling projects. He said that the historic home should be restored and reserved. He restored the house to its original state as much as was possible.

See also 
 Darlington School
 Rome, Georgia

External links 
 Home on the Hill
 Home to Darlington Presidents
 Welcome to the US Petabox
 Document
 A History of Rome and Floyd County, State of Georgia, United States of America: Including Numerous Incidents of More Than Local Interest, 1540-1922, Volume 1
 Philip Walker Hemphill

Houses in Floyd County, Georgia
Buildings and structures in Rome, Georgia
Houses completed in 1832
Antebellum architecture